The men's team épée was one of ten fencing events on the fencing at the 2000 Summer Olympics programme. It was the twenty-first appearance of the event. The competition was held on 18 September 2000. 33 fencers from 11 nations competed.

Draw
The field of 11 teams competed in a single-elimination tournament to determine the medal winners.  Semifinal losers proceeded to a bronze medal match. Matches were also conducted to determine the final team placements.

Finals

Classification 5-8

Classification 9-11

References

External links
 Report of the 2000 Sydney Summer Olympics

Epee team
Men's events at the 2000 Summer Olympics